Ballyhack is a settlement in the Canadian province of Newfoundland and Labrador. It is part of the town of Avondale. It was named after Ballyhack in Ireland.

See also
List of communities in Newfoundland and Labrador

References 

Populated coastal places in Canada
Populated places in Newfoundland and Labrador